The 27th National Film Awards, presented by Directorate of Film Festivals, the organisation set up by Ministry of Information and Broadcasting, India to felicitate the best of Indian Cinema released in the year 1979. Ceremony took place in April 1980.

Awards 
Awards were divided into feature films and non-feature films.

Lifetime Achievement Award

All India Award 

Following were the awards given:

Regional Award 

The awards were given to the best films made in the regional languages of India.

References

External links 
 National Film Awards Archives
 Official Page for Directorate of Film Festivals, India

National Film Awards (India) ceremonies
1980 Indian film awards